Walton on the Wolds is a village and civil parish in the Charnwood district of Leicestershire, England.  In the United Kingdom Census 2011 the parish had a population of 288.  It is near to Burton on the Wolds and Barrow upon Soar. It was the location of one series of Boon, starring Neil Morrissey. The series used the Tudor house, Kings Cote, as Boon's house.

The name Walton is derived from the settlement or farmstead of Wealas - native Celts, which is what the new Anglo Saxon speaking peoples called the native inhabitants of England.

The village has an Anglican church called St Mary's.

References

External links

Villages in Leicestershire
Civil parishes in Leicestershire
Borough of Charnwood